A multi-purpose stadium is a type of stadium designed to be easily used by multiple types of events. While any stadium could potentially host more than one type of sport or event, this concept usually refers to a specific design philosophy that stresses multifunctionality over specificity. It is used most commonly in Canada and the United States, where the two most popular outdoor team sports – Canadian football/American football and baseball – require radically different facilities. Football uses a rectangular field while baseball is played on a diamond and large outfield. Since Canadian football fields are larger than American ones, the design specifications for Canadian facilities is somewhat less demanding. The particular design to accommodate both is usually an oval, although some later designs use an octorad. While building stadiums in this way means that sports teams and governments can share costs, it also imposes some challenges.

In North America, multipurpose stadiums were built primarily during the 1960s and 1970s as shared home stadiums for Major League Baseball and National Football League or Canadian Football League teams. Some stadiums were renovated to allow multipurpose configurations during the 1980s. This type of stadium is associated with an era of suburbanization, in which many sports teams followed their fans out of large cities into areas with cheaper, plentiful land. They were usually built near highways and had large parking lots, but were rarely connected to public transit. As multipurpose stadiums were rarely ideal for both sports usually housed in them, they had fallen out of favor by the 1990s, with the SkyDome (in Canada) that opened in 1989 being the last such stadium completed to accommodate baseball and football. With the completion of the Truman Sports Complex in Kansas City in 1973, a model for purpose-built stadiums was laid down. Since Oriole Park at Camden Yards opened in 1992, most major league sports stadiums have been built specifically for one sport. From the late 2000s onward, however, some football specific stadiums that are either domed or open-air (Texas Stadium, RCA Dome, Georgia Dome, and Bank of America Stadium) have been or may be replaced by multipurpose stadiums with a retractable roof (Cowboys Stadium, Lucas Oil Stadium, and Mercedes-Benz Stadium) and even a roll-in natural grass field (State Farm Stadium) where NFL football remains the primary tenant but which can also accommodate other events year-round (soccer, concerts, major conventions, and NCAA Final Four basketball), although not baseball as that demands radically different field dimensions.

Outside North America, the term is rarely used, since association football (i.e. soccer) is the only major outdoor team sport in many countries; in many countries, association football and rugby can easily co-exist. In Australia, many sports grounds are suited to both Australian rules football and cricket, as Australian rules is played on cricket ovals. In some cases such as Stadium Australia in Sydney, Docklands Stadium in Melbourne and National Stadium, Singapore, stadiums are designed to be converted between the oval configuration for cricket and Australian rules football and a rectangular configuration for rugby and association football and in the case of Singapore's National Stadium, an athletics configuration as well. Association football stadiums have historically served as track and field arenas, as well, and some (like the Olympiastadion in Berlin) still do, whereas a newer generation frequently has no running track to allow the fans closer to the field.

Among winter sports, especially a speed skating rink can be a multi-purpose stadium. Very often a rink or two of approximately the size 61 × 30 metres – the regulation size of an IIHF ice hockey rink – are placed inside the oval. Sometimes the ice surface is even larger, allowing for also bandy and curling.

History in the United States
Several stadiums hosted multiple sports teams prior to the advent of multi-purpose stadiums.

In New York City, the Polo Grounds hosted football teams early on, as its rectangular nature lent itself well to football, and was also used for baseball. The original Yankee Stadium was designed to accommodate football, as well as track and field (Yankee Stadium popularized the warning track, originally designed as a running track around baseball fields), in addition to its primary use for baseball.

In addition to  baseball, Fenway Park and Braves Field would host college football, and also several professional football teams (all of whom relocated within a few years). Wrigley Field, while originally built for baseball, also hosted the Chicago Bears, Comiskey Park hosted the Chicago Cardinals, and Tiger Stadium hosted the Detroit Lions. Later venues such as Cleveland Stadium, Milwaukee County Stadium and Baltimore Memorial Stadium were all built to accommodate both baseball and football.

In 1920s New England, outdoor wood-track velodromes such as the East Hartford Velodrome and Providence's Cycledrome could, with some compromises, fit an American football field in their infields: early NFL franchises in each city (the Hartford Blues and Providence Steam Roller, respectively) used the velodromes as their home stadiums.

In the 1960s, multi-purpose stadiums began replacing their baseball-only and football-only predecessors, now known as "classics" or "jewel box" parks. The advantage to a multi-purpose stadium is that a singular infrastructure and piece of real estate can support both teams in terms of transportation and playing area, while money (often public funds) that would have been spent to support infrastructure for two stadiums can be spent elsewhere.

Also playing into the advent of the multipurpose stadium was Americans' growing use of automobiles, which required professional sports stadiums surrounded by parking: most cities lacked affordable space for such stadiums near their city centers, so multi-purpose stadiums were typically built in suburbs with freeway access.

Subsets of the multipurpose stadiums were the so-called "cookie-cutter stadiums" or "concrete donuts" which were all very similar in design. They featured a completely circular or nearly circular design, and accommodated both baseball and football by rotating sections of the box seat areas to fit the respective playing fields. These fields often used artificial turf, as it could withstand the reconfiguration process more easily, or be removed for nonsporting events. Furthermore, many of these stadiums were either enclosed domes (where natural grass could not grow without sunlight) and/or located in cold-weather cities (where undersoil heating was expensive and unreliable), and prior to the development of hybrid grass and improved natural grass cultivation techniques, artificial turf was the best solution at the time.

The first of these "cookie-cutter" or "concrete donut" stadiums was Robert F. Kennedy Memorial Stadium in 1961; it was followed during the 1960s and 1970s by Shea Stadium in 1964, Atlanta–Fulton County Stadium and the Astrodome in 1965, Busch Memorial Stadium and Oakland Coliseum in 1966, San Diego Stadium in 1967, Riverfront Stadium and Three Rivers Stadium in 1970, Veterans Stadium in 1971, and the Kingdome 
in 1976.

Eight of these eleven stadiums have been since demolished, with Atlanta–Fulton County Stadium demolished in 1997, the Kingdome in 2000, Three Rivers Stadium in 2001, Riverfront Stadium in 2002, Veterans Stadium in 2004, Busch Memorial Stadium in 2005, Shea Stadium in 2009, and San Diego Stadium in 2021. Further, the Astrodome has been vacant since 2008 due to it failing to meet current fire and building code requirements, while RFK Stadium has been vacant since 2017, when the DC United soccer club moved out, with its demolition being slated for 2022.

Thus, only the Oakland Coliseum (now known as RingCentral Coliseum) remains in use, while the Athletics are now the sole tenants of RingCentral Coliseum as the Oakland Raiders relocated to Las Vegas in 2020.

The Hubert H. Humphrey Metrodome was unusual as one of the few air-supported dome stadiums that was multipurpose in practice, being convertible between football and baseball. Home of the Minnesota Vikings through the 2013 season, it was also home to the Minnesota Twins until 2009 and the Minnesota Golden Gophers football team (NCAA) until 2008 as well as the Minnesota Golden Gophers baseball team (NCAA) until 2012. The Metrodome has been demolished, with U.S. Bank Stadium, built mainly for professional football but able to convert to a college baseball stadium, now sitting on its former site. Most other inflatable domes, such as the Hoosier Dome and Pontiac Silverdome, were football-only stadiums although both stadiums hosted basketball; the later-RCA Dome hosted the NCAA Division I men's basketball tournament many times and hosted the Final Four multiple times while the Silverdome was the home arena for the Detroit Pistons for most of the 1980s. The Carrier Dome was another such air-supported, multipurpose stadium, although it was built to accommodate outdoor sports such as football and indoor sports such as basketball. The Carrier Dome, since renamed JMA Wireless Dome, remains in use, although its air-supported roof was replaced by a fixed roof in 2020.  Air-supported domes fell out of favor in the 21st century after notable weather-related collapses in Minnesota and Pontiac exposed the drawbacks of air-supported domes in snowy locales.

During the height of the multipurpose stadium construction era of the 1960s and 1970s, three baseball-only stadiums were constructed: Candlestick Park (1960), Dodger Stadium (1962), and Royals Stadium (1973; now Kauffman Stadium). Anaheim Stadium (now known as Angel Stadium), although designed primarily for baseball, opened in 1966 with a press box in the upper tier on the third-base line oriented specifically for football, along with space beyond right field for a movable grandstand to accommodate an additional 13,000 fans for a future pro football franchise. This additional grandstand was indeed added to Anaheim Stadium in 1980 to accommodate the Los Angeles Rams' move from the Los Angeles Memorial Coliseum. Anaheim Stadium was renovated to a baseball-only facility in 1997, three years after the Rams' departure for St. Louis. Similarly, Candlestick Park was renovated into a multipurpose stadium in 1970 to accommodate the San Francisco 49ers' move from Kezar Stadium and converted to football only after the San Francisco Giants moved to their new ballpark in 2000. Candlestick Park was demolished in 2015. Another baseball stadium, Denver's Mile High Stadium, was also renovated with additional seating, including a 4,500-ton, three-tier movable grandstand to accommodate both baseball and football configurations. Mile High Stadium was home to the AFL/NFL Denver Broncos and the MLB Colorado Rockies franchises.

For the 1996 Summer Olympics,the  Atlanta Committee for the Olympic Games (ACOG) built the temporary  Centennial Olympic Stadium in a way that it could be converted to a new baseball stadium, and ACOG paid for the conversion. This was considered a good agreement for the Organizers,the International Olympic Committee,the Braves and the city because no demand existed for a permanent 85,000-seat stadium in Atlanta, as the 71,000-seat covered Georgia Dome had been completed four years earlier by the state. Furthermore, the Braves had already been exploring opportunities for a new venue to replace the outdated Atlanta–Fulton County Stadium. The southwest corner of the Olympic Stadium was built to accommodate the future baseball infield and seating. This is observable in aerial views and plans of the stadium in its Olympic configuration, where the seats are not placed next to the oval running track. The southwest part of the stadium also had four tiers of seats, luxury boxes, a facade facing the street, and a roof, whereas the northern half of the stadium used a simpler two-tiered seating configuration. During reconstruction, the athletics track was removed, and the north half of the stadium was demolished, reducing the capacity to 49,000 when it reopened as Turner Field. Because of the former track area, the field of play, particularly foul territory, although not large by historical standards, was larger than most MLB stadiums of its era. After the 2016 season, the Braves moved to the new SunTrust Park, and Georgia State University purchased Turner Field and surrounding parking lots for a major campus expansion project. As part of this project, Turner Field was reconfigured as Center Parc Stadium, a downsized rectangular stadium that is now home to the university's football team.

History in Canada
The first multipurpose stadium in the country was the Montreal Olympic Stadium that was which was built for the 1976 Summer Olympics and had initial functions to host events of different sports and types. But over time it became a white elephant.But the first success story was the Commonwealth Stadium in Edmonton which was built for the 1978 Commonwealth Games.

In Canada, several large multisport stadiums were built during this style's heyday. However, unlike in the United States, an NFL team has never been based primarily in Canada (though the Buffalo Bills played some home games in Toronto between 2008 and 2013) and only two MLB teams have been based there, so teams from these leagues have not been the major impetus behind stadium construction (with the notable exception of Toronto). Instead, stadiums were built primarily for Canadian Football League teams and to host multiple-sport events, such as the Winter Olympics, Commonwealth Games, and Pan American Games.

Three of Canada's largest stadiums from this era and type feature domed or retractable roofs, namely BC Place in Vancouver, SkyDome/Rogers Centre in Toronto, and Olympic Stadium in Montreal.

BC Place is capable of hosting baseball, but has been primarily a football venue. Rogers Centre was built to accommodate baseball (MLB's Toronto Blue Jays play there), but was a football venue until the CFL's Toronto Argonauts moved to BMO Field after the 2015 CFL season. Montreal's Olympic Stadium was built primarily for a multisport event (the 1976 Summer Olympics, during which it hosted the athletics,equestrian,football and latter than for professional team sports, but it later became the home of the Montreal Alouettes football team and the Montreal Expos baseball team, and began serving as an alternate home to the Montreal Impact when that team entered Major League Soccer in 2012. Similarly, the open-air Commonwealth Stadium in Edmonton was constructed for the 1978 Commonwealth Games and the 1983 Summer Universiade but has also become home of the Edmonton Elks of the CFL. It has also hosted many association football events, as well as the 2003 Heritage Classic, the first major outdoor ice hockey event in Canada. Tim Hortons Field, which opened in 2014, was built both as a venue for the 2015 Pan American Games and as the new home of the Hamilton Tiger-Cats football team; its predecessor, Ivor Wynne Stadium, was originally built for the first Commonwealth Games.

Other Canadian cities never expressed interest in building a venue for Major League Baseball or the Summer Olympics, and felt no need to replace their smaller, open-air stadiums used mostly for Canadian football. For example,Calgary's open-air McMahon Stadium dates from 1960 and has been used only for Canadian football, the 1988 Winter Olympics opening and closing ceremonies, and an outdoor ice hockey event (the 2011 Heritage Classic). Similar situations hold in Ottawa, Winnipeg, Hamilton, and Regina. No large stadiums of any kind are in cities such as Quebéc City, London or Saskatoon, or in Atlantic Canada; in those places (with the exception of Saskatoon), smaller stadiums (less than 13,000 seats) exist that can be augmented with temporary seating to bring their capacities close to that of the smaller CFL stadiums.

Outside North America 

The idea of a sharp difference between a multipurpose stadium and a single-sport stadium is less important outside of North America, since in most countries stadiums that are constructed with football in mind are easily able to accommodate rugby, track and field, or other sports with a similar-sized playing field. For example, any large stadium in most of Latin America, part of Asia, most of Africa, or continental Europe is likely to be used mostly for association football. The majority of the largest stadiums in the world were built for either association football or American football.

The regions where other outdoor sports can draw numbers comparable to association football or American football are limited. They include: baseball in Japan and the Spanish Caribbean; cricket in England, Australia, the Anglophone Caribbean, and the Indian subcontinent; rugby (union or league) in Wales, England, Ireland, South Africa, New Zealand, Fiji, the country of Georgia, and parts of Australia and France; Australian rules football in Australia; bandy in Russia and Scandinavia; and Gaelic games in Ireland.

However, even in these areas, the amount of compromise needed to accommodate multiple sports varies considerably. Most outdoor team sports have a rectangular playing field, but cricket and Australian-rules fields are rounded, while baseball is played in a diamond. This makes them much harder to accommodate within a rectangular-shaped stadium. Likewise, accommodating athletics, such as for a Summer Olympics, means constructing a rounded 400-m track around the infield. This often means the sports simply find it easier to play in separate stadiums.

In the case of Ireland, grounds built for Gaelic games are physically capable of hosting association football and the rugby codes without changing the seating configuration. Because the Gaelic games' pitch is rectangular and also longer and wider than that of football or either rugby code, the only changes required are the physical goals and field markings. However, opposition to those sports within large parts of the Gaelic games community, most notably manifested in GAA Rule 42, means that football and rugby clubs have generally had to play in separate grounds.

True multisport facilities, where teams from a variety of sports use the same stadium as their home ground, exist outside North America in a few cases, most of those smaller stadiums. A handful are notable for having 60,000 seats or more. The Melbourne Cricket Ground hosts cricket, Australian rules football, and association football. Accor Stadium hosts cricket and Australian rules football, as well as both rugby codes and association football. Wembley Stadium in London, Stade de France near Paris, and Millennium Stadium in Cardiff are not the permanent homes to any club teams, but are used primarily for international competitions and major tournament finals, mostly for association football and rugby (though Wembley has regularly hosted American football fixtures). In South Africa, Soccer City and Ellis Park Stadium have hosted rugby union and football, while Moses Mabhida Stadium has hosted football and cricket. Jawaharlal Nehru Stadium, Kochi in India hosts cricket and football. Eden Park in New Zealand hosts rugby union and cricket. Sky Stadium in Wellington, New Zealand, has hosted both rugby codes, cricket, association football, and Australian rules.

The architects Arup cited history that a rarely-used athletics track does not work with association football, as these multi-purpose stadiums substantially lengthen the viewing distance for spectators, as compared to football-specific stadiums. Notable unsuccessful past examples, of football matches played within athletics stadiums include the former Stadio delle Alpi and the Munich Olympic Stadium, with both Juventus and Bayern Munich moving to new stadiums less than 40 years after inheriting them. The delle Alpi's design was criticized, as it left spectators exposed to the elements, and the long distance between the stands and the pitch resulted in poor visibility. This was because the athletics track, which was seldom used, was constructed around the outside of the pitch, while views from the lower tier were also restricted due to the positioning of advertising boardings. These factors contributed to low attendances; only 237 spectators showed up for the Coppa Italia home match against Sampdoria in the 2001–02 season, while in the 2005–06 season, the average attendance was 35,880. Manchester City Council wished to avoid creating a white elephant, so to give the stadium long-term financial viability, extensive work was carried out to convert the City of Manchester Stadium from a field and track arena to a football stadium. The old Estádio da Luz was demolished so that the football-specific replacement could be built on the site as part of Portugal's bid to host Euro 2004. German stadiums such as the AWD-Arena, Commerzbank-Arena, Gottlieb-Daimler-Stadion, RheinEnergieStadion, AOL Arena, and Zentralstadion also underwent reconstruction/renovation by removing the running track to become football-only venues; several of these projects were done in preparation for the 2006 FIFA World Cup.

A different take on the multipurpose concept can be seen in the Saitama Super Arena in Japan and Paris La Défense Arena in the inner suburbs of Paris. Both venues are similar to JMA Wireless Dome in that they are fully enclosed stadiums (though with fixed roofs instead of the Dome's original air-supported roof) that can accommodate field and indoor court sports. However, they differ from JMA Wireless Dome in the specific way they accommodate court sports. Both the Super Arena (used mainly for basketball, volleyball, mixed martial arts, and professional wrestling events) and Paris La Défense Arena (home of rugby union's Racing 92) feature movable seating blocks that allow each facility to serve as an appropriately sized venue for either field or court sports.

In 2014, Singapore's new National Stadium was opened. It has the ability to convert between an oval for cricket, rectangle for rugby & association football and a running track for athletics.

Field layout

Most multipurpose stadiums that existed in North America overlaid one sideline of the football field along one of the baseball foul lines, with one corner of the football field being located where home plate would be. Because the length of a regulation American football field is 360 feet, longer than the roughly 330-foot average for foul lines in Major League Baseball, this requires an unusually long distance from the home plate to the fence along the foul line on which the football field is constructed, part of the football field to be constructed in foul territory (and the size of said territory to be increased accordingly), or a temporary wall. The Oakland Coliseum uses a configuration such that its football sideline runs along a line drawn from first base to third base (the former Atlanta–Fulton County Stadium also used this configuration). This was done presumably to make the same coveted seats behind home plate at a baseball game also coveted 50-yard line seats at a football game, and also so the stadium would need only one press box. Different stadiums have different angles between the left- and right-field seats.

In stadiums that were primarily football stadiums converted to baseball stadiums, the stands were at nearly right angles. This allowed the football field to be squared within the bleachers, but left the baseball configuration with many undesirable views farther away from home plate or facing away from the diamond, such as at the Kingdome, the Hubert H. Humphrey Metrodome, and the venue now known as Hard Rock Stadium. For stadiums such as the Los Angeles Memorial Coliseum, where the Los Angeles Dodgers played their home games from 1958 through 1961 while awaiting completion of Dodger Stadium, this also had the undesirable effect of having unusually short foul lines, making it easier to hit so-called "Chinese home runs". Baseball stadiums that converted to football stadiums had more of an obtuse angle between the stands. This made the football viewing farther away, and in some cases partially obscured as in Candlestick Park.

In the case of Qualcomm Stadium, it was constructed with half of the field-level seating permanent (built of concrete, in the southern quadrant of the stadium), and the other half portable (modular construction using aluminum or steel framing). When the stadium was configured for baseball, the portable sections would be placed in the western quadrant of the stadium and serve as the third-base half of the infield. In the football configuration, these are placed in the northern quadrant of the stadium (covering what is used as left field in the baseball configuration) to allow for the football field to be laid out east-west. This had the advantage of improving sightlines for both sports while keeping the baseball dimensions roughly symmetrical. Qualcomm Stadium's square-circle "octorad" layout was considered an improvement over the other cookie cutter stadiums of the time, and it was the last of the old multi-purpose stadiums to host a Super Bowl (Super Bowl XXXVII).

More modern multi-purpose stadiums have used more elaborate methods to accommodate multiple sports; Tottenham Hotspur Stadium, for example, uses two sets of turfs, one a movable natural grass surface for soccer, and the other a synthetic turf surface for gridiron. To accommodate the different sightlines preferred in each sport, the soccer surface is positioned several feet above the gridiron, so that the seats are closer to the field in its soccer configuration and elevated above the sidelines and coaches in its gridiron configuration.

In the 2010s, some football-specific stadiums (either enclosed domes like the Georgia Dome or open-air Bank of America Stadium) have been or may be replaced by multipurpose stadiums with a retractable roof (such as Mercedes-Benz Stadium) where NFL football remains the primary tenant but which can also accommodate soccer, concerts, major conventions, and NCAA Final Four basketball, although not baseball as that demands radically different field dimensions.

Criticisms

While multipurpose stadiums were intended to easily accommodate both American football and baseball (and in some cases, association football), the fundamentally different sizes and shapes of the playing fields made them inadequate for either sport. When used for baseball, the lower-level boxes were usually set back much farther from the field than comparable seats in baseball-only parks because they swiveled into position for American football and association football. In the case of stadiums that hosted both baseball and Canadian football, the lower boxes were set even farther back than their American counterparts, because Canadian football fields are 30 yards longer and considerably wider than their American counterparts. Likewise, attempts to build stadiums without support columns to obstruct spectators' views, as was the case with sport-specific "jewel box" stadiums, resulted in upper decks being placed very high above the field—as far as 600 feet away in some cases. Several teams closed off sections of the upper level and only sold them during the playoffs, as they were too far away to be of any use during the regular season. For football, the seats nearest the field were set farther back than at football-only stadiums to accommodate the larger baseball field. In some cases, the seats closest to the field, normally prime seats for baseball, were almost at field level for football. In general, spectator sightlines were not optimized for either sport, i.e., seats were angled towards the center of the field rather than towards the logical center of the game action (home plate for baseball and the 50-yard line for football).

In the baseball configuration, most had symmetrical field dimensions. This detracted from the unique, individual identity enjoyed by the sport-specific "jewel box" stadiums with odd or asymmetrical field dimensions, and further supported the "cookie cutter stadium" nickname.

The large capacities of multipurpose stadiums were usually more than adequate for football. However, baseball crowds tend to be much smaller than football crowds, resulting in baseball games at these stadiums being swallowed up in the environment. This was especially true if a baseball team were not doing particularly well either on the field or in the box office. This was another reason some baseball teams closed sections of the upper level during the regular season.

Many multipurpose stadiums also had artificial turf playing surfaces, to ease the transition from baseball field to football field and vice versa. Most early installations of artificial turf such as the original AstroTurf was nothing more than carpet on top of concrete with little padding material that was easy to apply and remove. Such types of removable artificial turf caused frequent injuries to players, and eventually made free agents wary of signing with teams whose home field had artificial turf. During the first month of the football season, the playing field included the infield soil that is harder than the grass and is also a significant injury risk. Baseball purists disliked artificial turf, though the Cincinnati Reds took advantage of this on Riverfront Stadium's artificial turf; on offense by recruiting players who combined power and speed and encouraging line drive hitting that could produce doubles, triples and high-bouncing infield hits; while for defense the fast surface and virtually dirtless infield rewarded range and quickness by both outfielders and infielders, like shortstop Dave Concepción who used the turf to bounce many of his long throws to first.

The concrete or painted concrete façades of many stadiums of that era (multipurpose or sport-specific) were criticized by architects as uninviting. Most such stadiums were built in the relatively plain brutalist and international styles popular at the time, which fell out of fashion in the 1980s. Furthermore the "concrete donut" design made the stadium feel too enclosed and cut off panoramic views of the stadium's aesthetic surroundings (waterfront, skyline, mountains).

The suburban locales of many multipurpose stadiums (as well as other sport-specific stadiums also built there) were also a focal point for criticism. Choosing a suburb over a city core was meant to take advantage of lower land values and new freeways. Suburbs were often poorly serviced by public transit, and when coupled with the trend of personal transportation shifting from public transit to private cars in the mid-20th century, meant that many of the stadiums of that period (multipurpose or sport-specific) were surrounded by large parking lots. In some in suburban locales, hospitality, entertainment, and shopping facilities were often non-existent due to lacking the supporting population or municipality zoning restrictions. Suburban stadiums fell out of favor by the 1990s, in light of the growing trend of "walkable urbanism" as teams sought to return to the city core where they could develop or take advantage of existing hospitality in order to grow their fanbase. Many teams also relocated to where they could control mixed-use development around their new stadium; in a reversal of the above trend of teams moving away from suburbs, the Atlanta Braves left Turner Field for SunTrust Park.

Often the suburban stadium was often not located in the municipality that the team purportedly represented, and in some cases the stadium were built across a state border. An instance of this was Giants Stadium, which primarily hosted football, but was also an association football stadium at times; its primary tenants (New York Giants and New York Jets were nominally based in New York City, but Giants Stadium was neither in New York City or even New York State, instead being built in the Meadowlands of East Rutherford, New Jersey. As a result then-Governor Mario Cuomo would not attend any games at Giants Stadium (instead choosing to attend the home games of the Buffalo Bills as they were "New York State's only team" in the NFL). A similar criticism applied to Giants Stadium's replacement, MetLife Stadium.

Association football was perceived as an especially bad fit for this type of stadium because, in the United States, the sport does not draw as many fans to games as American football or baseball (with the exceptions of Atlanta and Seattle), resulting in the stadium being filled to only a fraction of its capacity. This, combined with a desire for more compact, intimate stadiums akin to those of European football clubs, led to the soccer-specific stadium movement. As of 2020, 18 of Major League Soccer's 26 clubs play in their own, soccer-specific stadiums, and two of the exceptions (FC Cincinnati and Nashville SC) are currently building their own soccer-specific stadiums. In addition, three of the four teams that will join MLS in 2021 and 2022 plan to open soccer-specific stadiums in time for their MLS debuts.

Scheduling was also a big issue, since the MLB postseason overlaps with the NFL regular season. If a baseball team advances in the postseason to the point where it is scheduled to play a postseason game on the same day the football team plays a home game, adjustments had to be made, such as having the game moved to Monday night or – if a division opponent were scheduled – have the game sites switched, putting the upcoming meeting on the road and playing the home game during the latter meeting. An example of the former happening was in 1997 when the Florida Marlins played game 7 of the World Series at home on Sunday, Oct. 26, which moved the Miami Dolphins game against the Chicago Bears to Monday night. An example of the latter happening was in 1989 when the San Francisco Giants hosted a postseason game on Sunday, Oct. 8, against the Chicago Cubs, the same day the San Francisco 49ers were scheduled to host their division rival New Orleans Saints. The Oct. 8 game was moved to New Orleans and the Nov. 6 game was moved to San Francisco.

In Australia, most major stadiums which can hold over 50,000, such as the Melbourne Cricket Ground and Adelaide Oval, are circular or oval-shaped venues which – while suitable for cricket and Australian rules football – pose the same sight-line problems for football, rugby league, and rugby union as an athletics venue would. Playing sports with rectangle-shaped pitches on larger ovals often means fans can be as much as 30 m or more from the sidelines. Both Stadium Australia in Sydney and the Docklands Stadium in Melbourne have retractable seating to be able to change from an oval to rectangle shape and bring fans closer to the action if needed. Lang Park in Brisbane is currently (as of 2020) the only purpose-built rectangle stadium in Australia (with fixed seating) with a capacity exceeding 50,000.

Replacement and retention 
The first real departure from the multipurpose stadium design occurred in 1972, when the Jackson County Sports Authority in Kansas City, Missouri, opened the Truman Sports Complex, which houses Kauffman Stadium (named Royals Stadium at the time of opening) and Arrowhead Stadium. The Truman Sports Complex was the first example of multiple stadiums being built for specific sports at the same time. The designers, Kivett and Myers, were then absorbed by Kansas City architecture firm Hellmuth, Obata, and Kassabaum to become HOK Sport + Venue + Event (now the independent firm Populous), which went on to design many professional sports venues in the United States. Though hailed as revolutionary at the time, the Truman Sports Complex model of stadium design was widely ignored for the next 20 years, though the influence of both Arrowhead and Kauffman Stadiums were easily seen in venues such as Giants Stadium.

During the 1990s and 2000s, most of the multipurpose stadiums used for MLB in the United States were replaced by "retro- style" ballparks. These parks were built in two varieties: "retro-classic" parks, which combine the interior and exterior design of the "classic" ballparks with the amenities of newer facilities; and "retro-modern" parks, which have modern amenities and "retro" interiors, but have modern exterior designs. The first "retro-classic" park in MLB was Oriole Park at Camden Yards in Baltimore, which opened in 1992 and was based mostly on the Pilot Field design. Many football teams that shared a stadium with a baseball team had their stadiums converted into football-only facilities shortly after the baseball tenant left, while other football teams followed their baseball counterparts and had new football-only stadiums constructed.

The widespread adoption of FieldTurf and similar modern artificial turfs beginning in the early 2000s also has had a role in the decline of the multipurpose stadium. While first-generation, short-pile turfs such as AstroTurf lent themselves well to multiple sports, this was not the case with FieldTurf and its competitors. Modern artificial turf requires a more permanent installation, including sand and rubber base and/or infill that is not easily removed, thus does not lend itself well to multipurpose stadiums. Because of such turfs' superiority in other features compared to the earlier turfs, it has been seen as easier to build new stadiums for each sport rather than attempt to share an inflexible turf installation among multiple sports. Some 21st-century multi-purpose stadiums, such as Tottenham Hotspur Stadium and State Farm Stadium, have developed a more elaborate method of placing an entire playing surface, such as a grass surface for association football and an artificial turf one for gridiron football, on one or more slabs (one at State Farm, three at Tottenham Hotspur) and towing the slab(s) in and out of place for each sport. Because of the expense of using this method, it is generally only used for the highest-level professional sports.

The Miami Marlins moved to Marlins Park, a new retractable-roof stadium in Miami, in 2012. Sun Life Stadium (now Hard Rock Stadium) was then renovated to eliminate its baseball functionality, making it a football-only stadium. With the Marlins' relocation, the Oakland Athletics were the last team in the U.S. still sharing a stadium with an NFL team (the Oakland Raiders), the Oakland Coliseum (now RingCentral Coliseum). This arrangement ended once the Raiders settled into the new Allegiant Stadium in Las Vegas, Nevada in 2020, leaving no stadiums shared between NFL and MLB franchises. The Athletics are currently seeking a new home.

Currently, North America's main soccer league, Major League Soccer, nominally requires soccer-specific stadiums, although it has allowed several teams that share ownership with other major professional teams to use existing stadiums built either for American football (such as Lumen Field in Seattle and Mercedes-Benz Stadium in Atlanta) or baseball (the current Yankee Stadium). Additionally, it allows teams to use multi-purpose stadiums as temporary homes while they build new stadiums, with examples including Yankee Stadium, Nippert Stadium in Cincinnati, and Nissan Stadium in Nashville. The now-defunct North American Soccer League had a similar requirement. The current second level, the USL Championship, has nominally required soccer-specific stadiums, but like MLS has allowed multiple teams to share stadiums originally built for either American football or baseball.

In Canada, smaller, more specialized stadiums have generally become more popular, but none of the major multiple-use stadiums of the 1970s and 1980s have been demolished . The Toronto Blue Jays shared Rogers Centre with the Toronto Argonauts of the CFL before the Argonauts moved to BMO Field after the 2015 season, and shared the facility on a part-time basis with the Buffalo Bills of the NFL for several years beginning in 2008. Before their 2015–16 move, the Argonauts had publicly announced plans to leave Rogers Centre twice, only to end up staying; during that time, the originally soccer-specific BMO Field (built on the site of multi-purpose Exhibition Stadium) was built by Toronto FC. The Blue Jays presently do not have any plans to leave Rogers Centre; the Argonauts had proposed renovating BMO Field so they could share it with Toronto FC in 2016, and the Bills ended their sharing agreement with the Rogers Centre and returned to playing all of its games in Buffalo after the 2013 season. BC Place in Vancouver is still used by the BC Lions and was also the Olympic Stadium for the 2010 Winter Olympics; the Lions played their 2010 season at the temporary Empire Field while BC Place was being renovated to replace the original air-supported roof with a retractable roof. The Vancouver Whitecaps, which entered Major League Soccer in 2011, shared Empire Field and are sharing the renovated BC Place with the Lions. This was intended to be a temporary arrangement until the MLS team could build their own Whitecaps Stadium, but local opposition to the planned stadium led the Whitecaps to make BC Place a long-term home. The Montreal Expos' owners often cited the inadequacy of Olympic Stadium as a reason for the team's financial troubles, which eventually led to relocation to Washington, D.C.. The Montreal Alouettes, who had folded twice before in Olympic Stadium, moved out of Olympic Stadium in its third incarnation to Molson Stadium. In soccer, the original Montreal Impact built the smaller Saputo Stadium, which was expanded to accommodate the team's 2012 entry into MLS. Both the Alouettes and Impact continue to use Olympic Stadium for playoff games and other special events when extra capacity is needed. Commonwealth Stadium in Edmonton received major upgrades to host the 2001 World Championships in Athletics, and continues to host the Edmonton Elks, but has only hosted the city's soccer team, FC Edmonton, for three matches in Canada's national cup competition, the Canadian Championship.

Still, several modern baseball-specific stadiums are able to be converted for football use. In addition to the aforementioned T-Mobile Park, which has hosted occasional college football games, San Francisco's Oracle Park hosted the San Francisco Demons of the original XFL, hosted the college bowl game now known as the Redbox Bowl from 2002 to 2013, and also hosted California Golden Bears football games in the 2011 season while that team's stadium was being renovated; Phoenix's Chase Field hosted the game now known as the Cheez-It Bowl from 2000 to 2005; and St. Petersburg's Tropicana Field which hosted the St. Petersburg Bowl from 2008 to 2017. Tropicana Field, being an indoor stadium, hosted the Tampa Bay Lightning ice hockey team for a time.  Yankee Stadium hosts the Pinstripe Bowl, New York City FC association football, and various other high-profile college football games.

Furthermore, some teams in the United Football League played their home schedule at a baseball-specific stadium. The California Redwoods played their home games at the aforementioned Oracle Park; though they moved to a football stadium in Sacramento (Sacramento Mountain Lions) in 2010 and 2011, they moved back to a baseball park (this time Raley Field) for 2012. Although their home field was the Citrus Bowl in Orlando, the Florida Tuskers played one 2009 home game at Tropicana Field. The Omaha Nighthawks played their inaugural 2010 season at a baseball park, Rosenblatt Stadium, and played in Rosenblatt's replacement, TD Ameritrade Park Omaha, which is used primarily for baseball's College World Series, until the league's demise.

See also
 Sport venue
 Sports complex

References

 
Stadiums